BL 8-inch howitzer can refer to either of two types of British heavy gun:

BL 8-inch howitzer Mk I–V
BL 8-inch howitzer Mk VI – VIII

203 mm artillery